The 1953 La Flèche Wallonne was the 17th edition of La Flèche Wallonne cycle race and was held on 2 May 1953. The race started in Charleroi and finished in Liège. The race was won by Stan Ockers.

General classification

References

1953 in road cycling
1953
1953 in Belgian sport
1953 Challenge Desgrange-Colombo